Te Purewa  (?–1842?) was a notable New Zealand tribal leader, war leader and peacemaker. Of Māori descent, he identified with the Tuhoe iwi. He was born in Whaitiripapa, Bay of Plenty, New Zealand.

References

1842 deaths
Ngāi Tūhoe people
New Zealand Māori soldiers
Year of birth missing